James Jerome Killeen (July 17, 1917 – September 8, 1978) was a Roman Catholic bishop who served the Archdiocese for the Military Services.

Biography
Born in New York City, Killeen was ordained to the priesthood on May 30, 1947. On November 7, 1975, Killeen was named titular bishop of Vamilla and auxiliary bishop of the Roman Catholic Archdiocese for the Military Services, USA.

Prior to being named a bishop, he had served as Chief of Chaplains of the United States Navy. He was consecrated bishop on December 13, 1975, and died in office.

See also

 Catholic Church hierarchy
 Catholic Church in the United States
 Historical list of the Catholic bishops of the United States
 Insignia of Chaplain Schools in the US Military
 List of Catholic bishops of the United States
 List of Catholic bishops of the United States: military service
 Lists of patriarchs, archbishops, and bishops
 Military chaplain
 Religious symbolism in the United States military
 United States military chaplains
 United States Navy Chaplain Corps

References

External links
 Archdiocese for the Military Services, USA, official website
 Archdiocese for the Military Services of the United States. GCatholic.org. Retrieved 2010-08-20.

Episcopal succession

1917 births
1978 deaths
Religious leaders from New York City
20th-century American Roman Catholic titular bishops
American military chaplains
Chaplains